Sion Emrys Bebb (born 3 October 1968) is a Welsh professional golfer.

Bebb was born in Church Village, Mid Glamorgan, and is the son of former Welsh international rugby player Dewi Bebb. He turned professional in 1986 and worked for many years as a club professional before forging a tournament career. He has struggled to establish himself on the top level European Tour and has visited qualifying school many times, successfully regaining his card in 2006 and 2007.

Bebb first gained his card on the European Tour through the 2006 qualifying school, having spent many years on the second-tier Challenge Tour. He had claimed his first win at that level earlier in 2006, at the Ryder Cup Wales Challenge, the week after his wife had given birth to their second child.

Professional wins (7)

Challenge Tour wins (1)

Other wins (6)
1999 Glenmuir Club Professional Championship, European Club Professional Championship
2005 Welsh PGA Championship
2006 Welsh PGA Championship
2017 Welsh PGA Championship
2022 Welsh PGA Championship

Team appearances
Professional
PGA Cup: 2000

See also
2006 European Tour Qualifying School graduates
2007 European Tour Qualifying School graduates
2009 Challenge Tour graduates

References

External links

Welsh male golfers
European Tour golfers
People from Church Village
Sportspeople from Rhondda Cynon Taf
Sion
1968 births
Living people